Xenosoma dubia is a moth in the subfamily Arctiinae first described by Warren in 1900. It is found in Ecuador.

References

Arctiinae